Anstee is a surname, and may refer to

Darren Anstee (born 1968), UK Financier
Eric Anstee, Chairman, Institute of Financial Accountants
Margaret Anstee (1926–2016), United Nations Under-Secretary General (in 1987)
Nick Anstee (born 1958), 682nd Lord Mayor of the City of London, from 2009 to 2010
Rae Anstee (born 1932), Australian nurse

See also 
 Anstey (surname)